Soulis Georgiades (1934–1997) was a Greek film producer and director.

Early life and family
Georgiades was born in Thessaloniki, Greece in 1934 to Dimitri and Maria (Domouza) Georgiades. His father was from Rapsani and his mother was from Thessaloniki. As a child, Georgiades was interested in cinema and organised small shows on his own. After finishing his education in Thessaloniki, he attended the Institute for the Study of Cinematography in Paris, where he studied with Costa-Gavras, Dimitri Kollatos, Vassilis Vassilikos, and Dimitris Makris. He finished his coursework in 1956.

Career
Georgiades worked as a commercial director for a number of advertisements, including for clients Fratelli Fabbri Editori and IMEC. In 1962, he founded the Art Film Production Company in Milan; his later advertisements were produced through here. He was the first to center Milva in an advertisement early in her career. In 1965, Minister George Mpakatselos asked him to move to Athens to help establish Greek public television. The following year, he founded his second company, General Film Production, which closed in 1979. From there, he founded DEK, Ltd., which offered video cassette duplication services. In 1976, he directed a twelve-film documentary series called Our National Heritage (Η εθνική μας κληρονομιά). In the mid-1980s, he acquired the studios of Finos Film, which included two  sound stages.

In 1988, he acquired a hotel and restaurant with the intending to integrate several foreign productions that made use of facilities for audio-visual soundstage. Throughout his career, he directed and produced tourist films for the company Greeks for Tourism. Georgiades was also a friend and collaborator of Walter Chiari.

He was a member of the Hellenic Union of Directors in 1969 and sat on the prize and admissions committees for the Thessaloniki International Film Festival in 1979 and 1980. He sat on the Committee of the Ministry of Hellenic Industry for the development of cinematography in 1980 and 1981. He was also a member of the Greek Association of Audiovisual Producers and remained on its board of directors until 1995.

Personal life
In addition to films, Georgiades enjoyed cooking and Italian cuisine. In 1957, he met Maria Bianconi, daughter of painter Fulvio Bianconi; the couple were married the following year in Milan and had two sons, Dimitri and Piero. They separated in 1971 and he remarried in 1985. He suffered a stroke in 1989 and had a bypass operation. He died of a heart attack in Athens on 24 January 1997.

Awards and honours
 1962: Prix d'honor, Trieste Film Festival
 1963: First prize, Bordighera Humour Film Festival 
 1964: First prize, Bordighera Humour Film Festival 
 1964: First prize, MIFED
 1964: First prize, Prime Minister of Italy

Selected filmography

Film

Television

References

ADVERTISING 'IN ITALY 1963 - 1964, Publisher's office Modern, Milan 1964
PRACTICAL GUIDE TO THE ADVERTISEMENT 'CINE-TELEVISION 1964 - 1965 Publisher's office Modern, Milan 1965 
Rapsani HISTORY AND BIOGRAPHY OF THE FAMILY GEORGIADES, Georgios A. Georgiades, Thessaloniki 1967 
WHO'S WHO, London, 1968 
ΚΙΝΗΜΑΤΟΓΡΑΦΟΣ ΚΑΙ ΤΗΛΕΟΡΑΣΗ (cinema and television), Vassilis Georgiadis, Athens 1981 
ΥΛΙΚΑ ΚΑΙ ΠΡΑΚΤΙΚΑ ΤΟΥ Α’ ΠΑΝΕΛΛΗΝΙΟΥ ΣΥΝΕΔΡΙΟΥ ΚΙΝΗΜΑΤΟΓΡΑΦΟΥ (Materials and minutes of the first meeting of the Panhellenic cinema) Αθήνα 1981

External links
 Obituary from Marieto Enterprise (in Greek; archive)
 Short list of his movies at Carosellomito.com (in Greek; archive)
 Short list of his movies at bfi.org.uk (in English; archive)
 Mention of Georgiades in Billboard (1983) (in English)

Mass media people from Thessaloniki
1934 births
1997 deaths
Greek film producers
Greek television producers
Greek film directors
Greek documentary film directors